Hang Loose With The Surfin' Lungs is the fourth album released by surf music band The Surfin' Lungs, released in 1996 on the Spanish label No Tomorrow. This album featured new drummer Ray Webb, re-christened Ray Banz by the group, who replaced LA-bound Graeme Block. Coming six years after their previous album, The Beach Will Never Die, this longplayer represented a progression in terms of musicianship and style, while Webb's vocals helped create a more rounder sound to the group. Also, Hang Loose had more of an edgier feel, with Clive Gilling's guitar work more prominent than previous releases. Of the 14 tracks, 13 were written by the group, while one, "Peppermint Twist" was a cover of a song by the Joey Dee and the Starliters, which was a No.1 hit single on the U.S. Billboard Hot 100 in 1961.

Track listing

Personnel
 Chris Pearce – vocals, guitar
 Steve Dean – vocals, bass, acoustic guitar
 Clive Gilling – vocals, guitar, keyboards, organ
 Ray Webb – drums, vocals, percussion

Notes
 "Born To The Beach" also featured on an Australian compilation, Remember The Beach on the Shock Records' label.
 A different mix of "I Don't Wanna Ride That Rollercoaster" appeared on a free CD that came with an edition of surf music fanzine California Music.
 The intro of "Beach Bound" was sampled and looped as a jingle for Sara Cox on Radio 1.
 "Hang Loose" reached number one in Barcelona for a week.

1996 albums
The Surfin' Lungs albums